The 1955–56 Yugoslav Ice Hockey League season was the 14th season of the Yugoslav Ice Hockey League, the top level of ice hockey in Yugoslavia. Six teams participated in the league, and Zagreb have won the championship.

Standings
Zagreb
Jesenice
Ljubljana
Partizan
Red Star
Mladost

References

External links
Yugoslav Ice Hockey League seasons

Yugo
Yugoslav Ice Hockey League seasons
1955–56 in Yugoslav ice hockey